Kerala is the second most urbanized state in India. The 47.7% of total population in Kerala is considered as urban population. It was just 25.9% a decade ago. The state consist of 6 city municipal corporations and 87 municipalities across its 14 districts. In January 2020, Economist Intelligence Unit (EIU) conducted a survey and found that 3 Kerala cities are there in the list of world's 10 fastest-growing urban areas. They are Malappuram (1), Kozhikode(Calicut) (4) and Kollam(Quilon) (10).<

References

Kerala, Urban growth
Cities by urban growth